S. Omana Kumari was an Indian professional field hockey player who played for India's women's national field hockey team from 1975 to 1986. She is a recipient of the Arjuna Award, for her contribution to Indian Field Hockey.

Achievements in hockey 
 Represented India from 1975 to 1986
 Represented Kerala from 1972 to 1979
 From 1980 to 1987, played for Indian Railways

Junior Nationals: (Representing Kerala) 
 1972 Pune  : Gold Medal
 1975 Sangrur( Pepsu)  : Bronze Medal
 1974 Trivandrum  : Gold Medal 
 1975 Ahmedabad

Senior Nationals : (Representing Kerala) 
 1973 Bhopal
 1974 Jaipur
 1975 Ahmedabad
 1976 Pune
 1977 Bangalore
 1978 Goa

Representing Indian Railways 
 1980 Indore  :  Gold Medal
 1981 Ahmedabad  :  Gold Medal
 1982 Kozhikode  :  Gold Medal
 1983 Shimla  :  Gold Medal
 1984 Bangalore  :  Gold Medal 
 1985 Kapurthala  :  Gold Medal (CAPTAIN)
 1986 Trivandrum  :  Gold Medal

South Zone Nationals 
 1976 Palayamkotu  :  Gold Medal
 1978 Trivandrum  :  Gold Medal

National Games : (played for Maharashtra) 
 1980 Jaipur	3rd position
 1981   Maharastra

International Achievements 
 1975 Begum Razool International Hockey Tournament Madras  :  Gold Medal
 1979 Pre Olympics  :  Moscow
 1980 Indo Russian Test Series in Russia  :  India
 1981 Asian Championship : Japan Gold Medal
 1981 PestaSykam Quadrangular Hockey Tournament – Japan(tentri)  :  Gold Medal
 1982 9th Asian Games New Delhi  :  Gold Medal
 1982 Begum Razool Hockey Tournament New Delhi  :  Gold Medal
 1982 Indira Gandhi International Hockey Tournament  :  Gold Medal
 1983 World Cup Hockey Tournament Malaysia
 1983 Indo-German Test Series in Germany and India
 1984 Indo-China Test Series China
 1985 Inter Continent Cup  Argentina
 1985 Indira Gandhi International Hockey Tournament  :  Gold Medal
 1986 10th Asian Games  :  Bronze Medal

Awards
 1980  :  G.V. Raja Award (Kerala)
 1988  :  ChathrapathiShivaji Award Maharashtra
 1998  :  Arjuna Award (Govt. Of INDIA)

References

Year of birth missing (living people)
Living people
Indian female field hockey players
Asian Games medalists in field hockey
Field hockey players at the 1982 Asian Games
Field hockey players at the 1986 Asian Games
Asian Games gold medalists for India
Asian Games bronze medalists for India
Medalists at the 1982 Asian Games
Medalists at the 1986 Asian Games
Recipients of the Arjuna Award
Field hockey players from Kerala